Dziubiele  is a village in the administrative district of Gmina Orzysz, within Pisz County, Warmian-Masurian Voivodeship, in northern Poland.

Notable residents
 Erich Hellmann (13 February 1916 – 24 January 1998), Fallschirmjäger officer

References

Dziubiele